La Plume was a French bi-monthly literary and artistic review.

La Plume or Laplume may also refer to:

 La Plume, Pennsylvania
 La Plume Township, Lackawanna County, Pennsylvania
 Laplume, a commune in Lot-et-Garonne department, France

See also
 
 Pluma (disambiguation)
 Plume (disambiguation)